CanWest Air is a charter airline based in La Crete, Alberta. Founded in 1986 as Little Red Air Service, CanWest Air provides on-demand charter services to the communities of the Little Red River Cree Nation as well as to various other companies throughout northern Alberta. Nor-Alta Aviation also provides Air Ambulance services under contract from Alberta Health Services. Nor-Alta Aviation purchased Can-West Corporate Air Charters Ltd., and became Can-West Corporate Air Charters a Nor-Alta Aviation Company in late 2015.

History 

Nor-Alta Aviation began in 1986 as Little Red Air Service, which was owned and operated by the Little Red River Cree Nation. The purpose was to provide passenger charter and air ambulance services between the communities of Fox Lake, John D'Or Prairie, and Garden River, Alberta. As the company expanded it began to offer additional charter services throughout northern Alberta and western Canada. Later, LRAS secured a contract from the Alberta provincial government to provide air ambulance services from Fort Vermilion.

Nor-Alta Aviation Leasing Inc. was formed in 2004 for the purpose of leasing aircraft to Little Red Air Service. These additional aircraft allowed LRAS to augment its air ambulance fleet and add executive charters to its list of services. In 2006 was acquired Slave Air, the two companies entered into a management agreement, and Nor-Alta Aviation Leasing purchased the assets of LRAS. The new company became known as Nor-Alta Aviation, and was headed by a group of local entrepreneurs from the nearby community of La Crete.

In the summer of 2010, Nor-Alta Aviation expanded its operations to Fort McMurray after the grounding of Air Mikisew.

In 2015 Nor-Alta Aviation purchased Can-West Corporate Air Charters Ltd., which was founded in 1988, and served Wabasca, Slave Lake and Edmonton with medevac, private and executive charters. In late 2015 Nor-Alta Aviation took on the Can-West Corporate Air Charters Ltd name as part of its takeover.

Prior to the end of 2015 Can-West Corporate Air Charters Ltd. secured the purchase of Meadow Air Ltd. and their fleet of Cessna 337’s.

Destinations 
CanWest Air does not offer any scheduled air services. Frequent destinations for charter flights include the communities of the Little Red River Cree Nation, as well as Fort Chipewyan, Fort McMurray, Grande Prairie, Edmonton, and several fishing lodges and oil camps throughout northern Alberta.

Fleet 
As of September 2019, CanWest Air has the following aircraft registered with Transport Canada:

References

External links

CanWest Air Charters.

Regional airlines of Alberta
Air Transport Association of Canada
Airlines established in 1986
1986 establishments in Alberta